The 2021 NCAA Division I Cross Country Championships was the 83rd edition of the annual NCAA Men's Division I Cross Country Championship and the 41st annual NCAA Women's Division I Cross Country Championship to determine the team and individual national champions of NCAA Division I men's and women's collegiate cross country running in the United States. 

These championships were hosted by Florida State University at the Apalachee Regional Park in Tallahassee, Florida.

In all, four different titles will be contested: men's and women's individual and team championships. Complete results for November 20, 2021 NCAA D1 Cross Country Championships.

Women's title
Distance: 6,000 meters
(DC) = Defending champions

Women's Team Result (Top 10)

Women's Individual Result (Top 10)

Men's title
Distance: 10,000 meters

Men's Team Result (Top 10)

Men's Individual Result (Top 10)

See also
 NCAA Men's Division II Cross Country Championship 
 NCAA Women's Division II Cross Country Championship 
 NCAA Men's Division III Cross Country Championship 
 NCAA Women's Division III Cross Country Championship

References
 

NCAA Cross Country Championships
NCAA Division I Cross Country Championships
NCAA Division I Cross Country Championships
Sports in Tallahassee, Florida
Track and field in Florida
NCAA Division I Cross Country Championships